is a Japanese wrestler. She is a two-time gold medalist at the Olympic Games, a three-time gold medalist at the World Wrestling Championships and a four-time gold medalist at the Asian Wrestling Championships.

She finished second at the 2015 World Wrestling Championships in Las Vegas and represented her country at the 2016 Summer Olympics winning a gold medal by defeating Maria Mamashuk of Belarus 3-0.

She celebrated her Olympic gold medal victory by delivering two fireman's carry takedowns to her coach (Kazuhito Sakae).

Kawai's Olympic gold medal was one of four won by Japan's women's wrestling team at the 2016 Rio games.

In 2021, Kawai won the gold medal in the 57 kg wrestling division at the Tokyo Olympics.  Her younger sister Yukako won gold in the 62 kg division the previous day.

Championships and accomplishments
 Tokyo Sports
 Wrestling Special Award (2016, 2017)

References

External links
 
 

1994 births
Living people
Japanese female sport wrestlers
Wrestlers at the 2016 Summer Olympics
Wrestlers at the 2020 Summer Olympics
Olympic wrestlers of Japan
Olympic gold medalists for Japan
Olympic medalists in wrestling
Medalists at the 2016 Summer Olympics
Medalists at the 2020 Summer Olympics
Wrestlers at the 2018 Asian Games
Asian Games medalists in wrestling
Asian Games bronze medalists for Japan
Medalists at the 2018 Asian Games
World Wrestling Championships medalists
Asian Wrestling Championships medalists
21st-century Japanese women